Grand Casablanca or Greater Casablanca (Arabic: الدار البيضاء الكبرى; Amazigh: Tamnaḍt Tameqqṛant n Anfa) was one of the sixteen former regions of Morocco that existed from 1997 to 2015. Located in coastal northwestern Morocco, it was the most densely populated region and covered an area of 1,117 km². The population at the 2014 census was 4,270,750. The region was the economic heart of the Moroccan economy with Casablanca, the region's capital, being the effective economic capital of Morocco.

The region was bordered by the Atlantic Ocean to the north and by the region of Chaouia-Ouardigha on the other three sides.

The last wāli or governor of Greater Casablanca was Mohammed Kabbaj.

Dissolution
In 2015, the region annexed El Jadida and Sidi Bennour Provinces from the region of Doukkala-Abda and the provinces of Benslimane, Berrechid and Settat from the region of Chaouia-Ouardigha to form the new region of Casablanca-Settat.

Administrative divisions
The Wilaya of Greater Casablanca consisted of two prefectures and two provinces:

 Prefecture of Casablanca
 Prefecture of Mohammedia
 Nouaceur Province
 Mediouna Province

See also
 Casablanca

References

External links
 Official site of the city of Casablanca

Former regions of Morocco